Simbarashe "Simba" Sithole (born 5 May 1989 in Masvingo) is a Zimbabwean footballer. He plays for the Zimbabwe national team.

Career

Club
Sithole began his career in Zimbabwe with How Mine, before subsequently joining Monomotapa United, Railstars and Hippo Valley. After spells with the aforementioned three clubs, Sithole rejoined How Mine. His return to How Mine led to a move to South African football. Firstly, a trial with AmaZulu in 2013 and then a permanent transfer to Ajax Cape Town in January 2014. Eight months later he left Ajax to return to Zimbabwe to play for Highlanders, however he left the Bulawayo-based club soon after. A short stint with Bulawayo City followed.

International
In January 2014, coach Ian Gorowa, invited him to be a part of the Zimbabwe squad for the 2014 African Nations Championship. He helped the team to a fourth-place finish after being defeated by Nigeria by a goal to nil.

Sithole scored his first international goal for the Zimbabwe national team in a 2014 African Nations Championship qualifier against Mauritius. He appeared for Zimbabwe against Gabon on 6 January 2014, and he scored his second goal for his country on 25 January 2014 against Mali. He was named in the Zimbabwe squad for the 2014 African Nations Championship alongside his then namesake Simba Sithole.

Career statistics

International

Statistics accurate as of match played 1 February 2014.

International goals
Updated to match played 25 January 2014. Scores and results list Zimbabwe's goal tally first.

Honours

Club
Monomotapa United
 Zimbabwe Premier Soccer League (1): 2008

References

External links
 
 

1989 births
Living people
Association football forwards
Sportspeople from Masvingo
Zimbabwean footballers
Zimbabwean expatriate sportspeople in South Africa
Expatriate soccer players in South Africa
How Mine F.C. players
Monomotapa United F.C. players
Highlanders F.C. players
Cape Town Spurs F.C. players
Bulawayo City F.C. players
Shooting Stars F.C. (Zimbabwe) players
Zimbabwe international footballers
Yadah Stars F.C. players
Zimbabwe A' international footballers
2014 African Nations Championship players